White Christmas most commonly refers to:
 White Christmas (weather), snowfall or snow-covered ground on Christmas Day
 "White Christmas" (song), a 1942 song written by Irving Berlin

White Christmas may also refer to:

Film and television
 White Christmas (film), a 1954 musical film
 White Christmas (soundtrack), the soundtrack to the 1954 film
 White Christmas (TV series), a 2011 South Korean television series
 "White Christmas" (Black Mirror), the 2014 Christmas special of Black Mirror
 "White Christmas" (Modern Family), a 2015 episode of Modern Family

Music

Albums 
 White Christmas (Peter Andre album) (2015)
 Irving Berlin's White Christmas, a 1954 album by Rosemary Clooney
 White Christmas (Pat Boone album) (1959)
 White Christmas (Rosemary Clooney album) (1996)
 Merry Christmas (Bing Crosby album) or White Christmas (1954)
 White Christmas (Al Green album) (1986)
 White Christmas (Martina McBride album) (1998)

Other 
 White Christmas (musical), a 2004 stage musical

Other uses
 White Christmas (food), an Australian dessert
 White Christmas (Warner Bros. Movie World), a night-time event held at Warner Bros. Movie World

See also